Monika Michałów (born 22 December 1988) is a Polish handballer for AZS Koszalin and the Polish national team.

International honours 
Carpathian Trophy:
Winner: 2017

References

1988 births
Living people
People from Łomża
Polish female handball players
21st-century Polish women